Calle de Alcalá is among the longest streets in Madrid. Henry David Inglis described it in 1837 as "long, of superb width, and flanked by a splendid range of unequal buildings".

History and landmarks 

Calle de Alcalá is one of the oldest streets in the city. It was the old road which led to the city of Alcalá de Henares (from which it takes the name) and continued to Aragón; today, this route is covered by the A-2 motorway. Along this street it is possible to find landmarks such as Banco Bilbao Vizcaya at number 16, the former Alcalá 20 discothèque at number 20, Edificio Metrópolis, the Unión y el Fénix Español building at number 23, Círculo de Bellas Artes, Plaza de Cibeles, Puerta de Alcalá, the Spanish Ministry of Education, the Instituto Cervantes HQ building, the Bank of Spain building, Parque del Buen Retiro and Plaza de Toros de Las Ventas.

In popular culture
Por la calle de Alcalá was a popular cuplé describing a florist selling tuberoses on the street.

Notable buildings

References

External links

 
Streets in Madrid